Isaac "Redd" Holt (born May 16, 1932) is an American jazz and soul music drummer.

Early life and education 
Holt was born in Rosedale, Mississippi, and raised in Chicago. He first began playing drums as a student at Crane High School, where he played in an ensemble with future collaborators Ramsey Lewis and Eldee Young. Holt studied music at the Chicago Musical College and radio and television at Kennedy–King College.

Career 
Holt enlisted in the United States Army in 1955 and was stationed in Germany, where he played with a military band, and upon his return worked with Lewis, alongside Young, from 1956 to 1966, in addition to recording with Earl Bostic and James Moody near the end of the 1950s. 

In 1966, Young and Holt split with Lewis and formed their own group, Young-Holt Unlimited, which went on to achieve commercial success as an instrumental soul band. After the group's dissolution in 1974 Holt continued on as Redd Holt Unlimited, playing under this name into the 1990s, and worked in jazz education in Illinois. He founded the Gumption Artist Workshop, which was active from 1980 to 1985, and played internationally, including at the 1988 Montreux Jazz Festival and in Singapore in the late-1980s and early-1990s. For 15 years, Holt also played with a trio at the East Bank Club in Chicago. The studio sessions produced a vinyl LP named, It's A Take! on the Treehouse Record label with eight full-length jazz standards.

Discography

As leader
 Look Out!! Look Out!! (Argo, 1963)
 Isaac, Isaac, Isaac (Paula, 1974)
 The Other Side of the Moon (Paula, 1975)

With Eldee Young
 Just for Kicks (Argo, 1962)
 Wack Wack (Brunswick, 1966)
 The Beat Goes On (Brunswick, 1967)
 Feature Spot (Cadet, 1967)
 Soulful Strut (Brunswick, 1968)
 Funky But! (Brunswick, 1968)
 Mellow Dreamin (Cotillion, 1970)
 Born Again (Cotillion, 1971)
 Oh Girl (Atlantic, 1973)
 Plays Super Fly (Paula, 1973)
 Another Evening at Somerset's Bar (Westin Plaza, 1990)
 Blues for the Saxophone Club (Golden String, 1996)
 Live at the Bohemian Caverns 1968 (Brunswick, 1998)

As sideman
With Ramsey Lewis
 Ramsey Lewis and his Gentle-men of Swing (Argo, 1956)
 Ramsey Lewis and his Gentle-men of Jazz (Argo, 1956)
 Down to Earth (EmArcy, 1958)
 Lem Winchester and the Ramsey Lewis Trio (Argo, 1958)
 An Hour with the Ramsey Lewis Trio (Argo, 1959)
 The Ramsey Lewis Trio in Chicago (Argo, 1960)
 Stretching Out (Argo, 1960)
 More Music from the Soil (Argo, 1961)
 Sound of Christmas (Argo, 1961)
 Never on Sunday (Argo, 1961)
 The Sound of Spring (Argo, 1962)
 Country Meets the Blues (Argo, 1962)
 Bossa Nova (Argo, 1962)
 Pot Luck (Argo, 1963)
 Barefoot Sunday Blues (Argo, 1963)
 More Sounds of Christmas (Argo, 1964)
 The Ramsey Lewis Trio at the Bohemian Caverns (Argo, 1964)
 Bach to the Blues (Argo, 1964)
 You Better Believe Me (Argo, 1965)
 The In Crowd (Argo, 1965)
 Hang On Ramsey! (Cadet, 1965)
 Swingin (Cadet, 1966)
 The Groover (Cadet, 1972)
 Solid Ivory (Cadet, 1974)
 Reunion (Columbia, 1983)

With others
 Lorez Alexandria, Early in the Morning (Argo, 1960)
 Eden Atwood, No One Ever Tells You (Concord Jazz, 1993)
 Bill Henderson, Sings (Vee Jay, 1959)
 Jeremy Monteiro & Young & Holt, Live at the Montreal Jazz Festival (J.J. Jazz, 2001)
 James Moody, Last Train from Overbrook (Argo, 1958)
 Shelley Moore, For the First Time... (Argo, 1961)
 Ken Nordine, Son of Word Jazz (Dot, 1957)
 Ken Nordine, Love Words (Dot, 1958)

References
Footnotes

General references
 	*Deborah Gillaspie and Barry Kernfeld, "Redd Holt". The New Grove Dictionary of Jazz. 2nd edition, 2001.

American jazz drummers
American soul musicians
People from Rosedale, Mississippi
1932 births
Living people
Jazz musicians from Mississippi